Johannes Focher (born 20 January 1990) is a German former professional footballer who plays as a goalkeeper for lower-league club RSV Meinerzhagen.

Club career 
Focher began his career for Hammer SpVg. In summer 2006, he transferred to the junior section of Borussia Dortmund. In this club he became vice-champion of the German Junior Championships in 2007 with the B-Juniors and 2009 with the A-Juniors. In the 2008–09 season, Focher won the second place of the DFB-Junioren-Vereinspokal, even though he wasn't used in the final. In the same season, he also played for Borussia Dortmund II in the Regionalliga West where he was used two times in the first part, 13 times in the second half. With his club he got promoted into the 3. Liga. In the next step he became the second goalkeeper behind Marcel Höttecke, but after the regular goalkeeper had moved up to the bench due to an injury of Roman Weidenfeller, he debuted on 7 February 2010 in an away match of the 3. Liga against Kickers Offenbach.

After the end of 2011–12 season, he left the club at the end of the season on a Bosman transfer. After being released, Borussia Dortmund confirmed that Focher will join Austrian side Sturm Graz on free transfer which will keep him on a contract until June 2014. On his move, Focher told Sportinformationsdienst "I did not really need to think about moving on. Sturm Graz is a household club, even in Germany. I am looking to play for the club, getting to know its fans and the city of Graz as well." Manager Focher expected to face competition with Christian Gratzei to become a first choice goalkeeper. Coach Peter Hyballa said about Focher: "Christian Gratzei is the top dog in the gate, and Johannes is his challenger. They will push each other to excel, it will benefit the entire team."

On 2 September 2013, he returned to Borussia Dortmund II on a one-year contract.

Career statistics

References

External links
 
 

1990 births
Living people
Sportspeople from Hamm
German footballers
Footballers from North Rhine-Westphalia
Association football goalkeepers
3. Liga players
Regionalliga players
Oberliga (football) players
Austrian Football Bundesliga players
Hammer SpVg players
Borussia Dortmund II players
Borussia Dortmund players
SK Sturm Graz players
FC Kray players
Schwarz-Weiß Essen players
German expatriate footballers
German expatriate sportspeople in Austria
Expatriate footballers in Austria